Place des Martyrs is a transfer station serving the Line 1 of the Algiers Metro. It was inaugurated on 9 April 2018 by President Abdelaziz Bouteflika.

Etymology
The Place des Martyrs metro station is also, in the opinion of specialists, an important step in the implementation of preventive archeology that has combined archaeological heritage and land use planning as part of the efforts to make from the capital a modern city. it is historic because of its location in the area of the ancient city of Ikosim which contains a rich archaeological heritage.

With an area of 8,000 m2, the Place des Martyrs was, before the advent of colonialism, a political and commercial center: hence the archaeological discoveries gradually brought to light. these are archaeological remains scattered over some 1,500 m2 and four (4) strata representing different periods of the history of the city of Algiers. the visitor can see today at the Place des Martyrs the emerging part of these excavations, in this case an Ottoman city on an area of 750 m2, while other vestiges remain buried pending an appropriate development.

Gallery

References

External links
 Algiers Metro Site
 Ligne 1 Algiers Metro on Structurae

Algiers Metro stations
Railway stations opened in 2018
Railway stations in Algeria opened in the 21st century